Attilio Giovannini (30 July 1924 – 18 February 2005) was an Italian footballer who played as a defender.

Club career
Giovannini debuted in the Italian Serie A with Lucchese before moving to Inter, where he won two consecutive league championships in  1953 and 1954. In 1954 he went to Lazio and at 32 years of age he retired not having scored a single career goal despite playing in 272 games in Serie A.

International career
Giovannini made 13 appearances for the Italy national team, making his debut in 1949. At the 1950 World Cup, he played as a right-sided full-back in the game against Paraguay.

He emigrated to the United States in 1957 and died there in February 2005 at the age of 80.

Honours
Inter
Serie A: 1953, 1954

Sources
La Gazzetta dello Sport

References

1924 births
2005 deaths
Italian footballers
Association football defenders
Inter Milan players
S.S. Lazio players
S.S.D. Lucchese 1905 players
Serie A players
Italy international footballers
1950 FIFA World Cup players
Italian emigrants to the United States